Izeda, Calvelhe e Paradinha Nova is a civil parish in the municipality of Bragança, Portugal. It was formed in 2013 by the merger of the former parishes Izeda, Calvelhe and Paradinha Nova. The population in 2011 was 1,212, in an area of 72.67 km².

References

Parishes of Bragança, Portugal